This Is Love is a studio album by American guitarist Lee Ritenour released in 1998 on GRP Records. The album reached No. 4 on the Billboard Contemporary Jazz Albums chart.

Overview
Artists such as Lisa Fischer and Phil Perry appear upon the album.

Covers
Ritenour covers "Alfie's Theme" by Sonny Rollins and "Baltimore" by Randy Newman on the album.

Critical reception

AllMusic noted that Ritenour "has grown as a mature jazz artist on this album".

Track listing

Personnel

 Lee Ritenour – guitar
 Gary Grant – trumpet
 Jerry Hey – trumpet
 Bill Reichenbach Jr. – trombone
 Bill Evans – saxophone
 Ernie Watts – saxophone
 Larry Williams – saxophone, keyboards
 Bob James – keyboards
 Alan Pasqua – keyboards
 Ronnie Foster – Hammond B3 organ
 Frank Becker – synthesizers
 James Genus – bass
 Melvin Davis – bass
 Sonny Emory – drums
 Dave Weckl – drums
 Paulinho da Costa – percussion
 Ralph Morrison – violin
 Lisa Fischer – vocals
 Phil Perry – vocals

Track information and credits adapted from the album's liner notes.

Charts

References

External links
This Is Love at Discogs
This Is Love at AllMusic

1998 albums
Lee Ritenour albums